Dafne Navarro Loza (born January 30, 1996) is a Mexican trampoline gymnast. She won the silver medal in the women's trampoline event at the 2015 Pan American Games held in Toronto, Canada. In 2019, she won the bronze medal at the Pan American Games held in Lima, Peru.

In 2018, she won the bronze medal in the women's synchro event, alongside Melissa Flores, at the 2018 Trampoline Gymnastics World Championships held in Saint Petersburg, Russia.

In 2021, she competed in the women's trampoline event at the 2020 Summer Olympics held in Tokyo, Japan.

In 2022, she represented Mexico in Pan American Gymnastics Championships. Dafne took gold medal in the team, silver medal in synchronised trampoline together with Michelle Mares, and bronze medal in individual.

References

External links 
 

Living people
1996 births
Mexican female trampolinists
Pan American Games medalists in gymnastics
Pan American Games silver medalists for Mexico
Pan American Games bronze medalists for Mexico
Gymnasts at the 2015 Pan American Games
Gymnasts at the 2019 Pan American Games
Medalists at the 2015 Pan American Games
Medalists at the 2019 Pan American Games
Gymnasts at the 2020 Summer Olympics
Olympic gymnasts of Mexico
Sportspeople from Guadalajara, Jalisco
21st-century Mexican women